Pleasant Prairie Power Plant was a 1.21-gigawatt (1,210 MW) coal power plant located in Pleasant Prairie, Wisconsin in Kenosha County. In 2009, it was listed by the U.S. Energy Information Administration (EIA) as the largest generating station in Wisconsin and generated roughly 13% of Wisconsin's electricity, burning around 13,000 tons of coal daily.

Background
The 30-year-old power plant has developed and applied a retrofit system that has helped reduce nitrogen oxide by up to 90% and sulfur dioxide by up to 95%. The Pleasant Prairie plant produces “8.6 million tons of  annually – about as much as (that produced by) 1.7 million US cars”, according to The Wall Street Journal. The plant uses experimental technology designed by French Alstom SA to separate carbon dioxide from the exhaust, and is seen as a proving ground for clean coal technology. The plant is owned by We Energies. In an effort to reduce carbon dioxide emissions, the plant uses a chilled ammonia (NH3) process developed by Alstom. that captures up to 90% of carbon emissions as it escapes the flue gas. The demonstration project began in March 2008 and would last for two years. The America’s Power Factuality Tour stopped at the Pleasant Prairie Power Plant to report on its role in generating electricity in the United States in 2009.

Pleasant Prairie received its coal from the Powder River Basin in Wyoming. Most of it is sourced from the Cordero Rojo Mine.

On November 28, 2017, WEC Energy Group announced that it would be closing the plant in 2018, pending permission from Midcontinent Independent System Operator (MISO). WEC cited market forces such as cheaper natural gas and renewables for the plant's closure. Pleasant Prairie shut down on April 3, 2018. The plant is expected to cost $1 billion over the next 2 decades while saving $2.5 billion in avoided costs.

See also

List of power stations in Wisconsin
Coal pollution mitigation

References

External links
 Pleasant Prairie Power Plant (P4)

Energy infrastructure completed in 1980
Energy infrastructure completed in 1985
Buildings and structures in Kenosha County, Wisconsin
Power stations in Wisconsin
Former coal-fired power stations in the United States
1980 establishments in Wisconsin
Former power stations in Wisconsin